Mega Shark vs. Kolossus is a 2015 science fiction film starring Illeana Douglas, Amy Rider and Brody Hutzler.

The film is a sequel in the Mega Shark film series.

Plot
Some time after the events of the previous film, the world's governments institute preparation plans in case another Mega Shark appears; another shark is awakened by Russian miners drilling underwater for red mercury. Meanwhile, a team of prospectors led by a man named Benedict searching for red mercury at the behest of an unknown sponsor enter a mine in Russia, where they discover a secret stock of the substance. One of Benedict's team is unmasked as American agent Moira King, but while a standoff between King and the Russians occurs, a giant robot hidden beneath the mine reawakens. King barely escapes while the robot, Kolossus, destroys the mine.

Dr. Alison Gray proposes to the military the use of her newly developed sonic transmitters, which she believes can influence the shark's behavior, but is rejected in favor of a more aggressive plan laid out by her colleague John Bullock. She is then summoned by tech mogul and environmentalist Joshua Dane, CEO of DaneTech Industries, who is aware of the government's plans thanks to his infiltrating their communications out of distrust for their intentions. Dane suggests that they work together to stop the shark in a more humane fashion and protect the environment. Elsewhere, King recruits desk worker Spencer to assist her in stopping Kolossus. Kolossus is discovered to be a mobile weapon of mass destruction created by the Russians during the Cold War, powered by red mercury and capable of multiple detonations.

The fleet led by Admiral Jackson carries out an attack on the shark, but fails and Dr. Bullock is thrown overboard. Dane and Alison approach on Dane's hydrofoil and offer to assist using Alison's transmitter, but the pod malfunctions and the shark escapes. King and Spencer come across the battle and join forces with Dane and Alison to find Kolossus' creator, Sergei Abramov. When they locate Abramov, he gives them a compass and clues to where the technology to control Kolossus can be found. Kolossus arrives and detonates, killing Abramov while the others escape.

Following Abramov's clues, the group locates the laboratory where he created Kolossus, which is now underwater. However, the shark is nearby; as its rampage continues, Admiral Jackson suffers a breakdown and initiates a nuclear launch before committing suicide. Lieutenant Commander Parker manages to override the order, aborting the strike, and King uses an American flag to draw the shark into the inlet where the laboratory is, trapping it. While King, Spencer, Alison and Dane search the laboratory for Kolossus' control device, however, the robot appears and begins fighting with the shark. They find the device and escape the lab just before the battle crushes it. Kolossus approaches Dane's ship, but they manage to connect the controller to Dane's computer system in time to stop it.

With Kolossus under control, Dane betrays the others, revealing that he was Benedict's sponsor and sabotaged Alison's transmitter to prevent the government from killing the shark before he could find red mercury. As he collects the red mercury from Kolossus, the shark attacks again, but he uses Kolossus to attach a transmitter to it, bringing the shark under his control as well. Dane broadcasts a message worldwide, announcing that he has control of both Mega Shark and Kolossus and plans to use Kolossus to destroy the cities that produce the most pollution, killing millions in the name of saving the environment. Several governments scramble fighter jets against him, but Dane uses Mega Shark and Kolossus to eliminate them. He then declares to the world that he expects a nuclear strike will come, warning that if he is killed, it will trigger the release of red mercury into the atmosphere, rendering Earth inhospitable for centuries. The US activates the Strategic Defense Initiative satellite, prompting Dane to have Kolossus throw the shark into space, knocking the satellite's laser off target so it hits the moon instead. Dane does not notice that when the shark lands back in the ocean, the transmitter falls off. The shark attacks Kolossus, causing Dane's control system to crash. Kolossus targets the ship; while Alison, King and Spencer - who escaped their bonds earlier - flee, Dane runs onto the beach and is crushed under Kolossus' foot.

Alison, King and Spencer watch from the shore as Mega Shark and Kolossus engage in a vicious final battle. Kolossus finally drags the shark down, wraps around it and detonates its entire remaining supply of red mercury, destroying both creatures. With the crisis over, the three survivors await rescue. Deep underwater, another egg hatches, giving birth to a new Mega Shark. In a post-credits scene, Dr. Bullock is killed by the new shark.

Cast
 Illeana Douglas as Dr. Alison Gray
 Amy Rider as Moira King
 Brody Hutzler as Joshua Dane
 Edward DeRuiter as Spencer
 Ernest Thomas as Admiral Titus Jackson
 Tara Price as Lieutenant Commander Elisha Parker
 Jeff Hatch as Dr. John Bullock
 Bryan Hanna as Benedict
 Patrick Bauchau as Sergei Abramov
 Rileah Vanderbilt as Rileah
 Tim Abell as Ivan

References

External links

2015 films
American science fiction films
2010s English-language films
2015 direct-to-video films
2015 independent films
The Asylum films
American disaster films
Films set in Russia
American robot films
Murder–suicide in films
Giant monster films
American natural horror films
2010s monster movies
Films about shark attacks
Fictional sharks
American sequel films
Syfy original films
American monster movies
2010s American films